Nøkleby,  Nökleby, or Nokleby is a Norwegian and Swedish surname. Notable people with the surname include:

Berit Nøkleby (1939–2018), Norwegian historian
Monica Elfvin (born 1938), later Nökleby, Swedish gymnast
Katrina Nokleby, Canadian politician